Khrenovoye is a rural locality (a selo) and the administrative center of Khrenovskoye Rural Settlement, Bobrovsky District, Voronezh Oblast, Russia. There are 33 streets.

Geography 
Khrenovoye is located 24 km east of Bobrov (the district's administrative centre) by road. Sloboda is the nearest rural locality.

References 

Rural localities in Bobrovsky District
Bobrovsky Uyezd